Sinozolini is a tribe of ground beetles in the family Carabidae. There are at least three genera and about eight described species in Sinozolini.

Genera
These three genera belong to the tribe Sinozolini:
 Chaltenia Roig-Juñent & Cicchino, 2001  (Argentina)
 Phrypeus Casey, 1924  (North America)
 Sinozolus Deuve, 1997  (China)

References

Trechinae